Nicole Ellen Stratford (born 1 February 1989) is a New Zealand association footballer who plays as a defender for German 2. Frauen-Bundesliga club FC Carl Zeiss Jena and the New Zealand women's national team.

Career
Stratford was a member of the New Zealand under-20 national team which participated at the 2008 FIFA U-20 Women's World Cup in Chile.

In June 2019, Stratford received her first call-up to the New Zealand women's national team for the 2019 FIFA Women's World Cup in France, replacing the injured Meikayla Moore. Though unused in the World Cup, she made her international debut on 7 November 2019 against China in the 2019 Yongchuan International Tournament, which finished as a 0–2 loss. She made her second appearance three days later against Canada.

In 2019, Stratford joined German club USV Jena of the Frauen-Bundesliga on a one-year contract.

Personal life
Stratford worked as a police officer in Auckland.

Career statistics

International

Notes

References

External links
 
 

1989 births
Living people
New Zealand women's association footballers
New Zealand women's international footballers
New Zealand expatriate women's association footballers
New Zealand expatriate sportspeople in Germany
Expatriate women's footballers in Germany
Women's association football defenders
FF USV Jena players
Frauen-Bundesliga players
2019 FIFA Women's World Cup players
New Zealand police officers
Women police officers